Malapterurus microstoma, the smallmouth electric catfish, is a species of electric catfish native to the Congo River basin of Central African Republic, the Democratic Republic of the Congo and the Republic of the Congo. This species grows to a length of  SL. This fish can be found in the aquarium trade. It is illegal to possess any species of electric catfish for personal or commercial use in Florida.

References

External links

Malapteruridae
Freshwater fish of Africa
Fish of the Central African Republic
Fish of the Democratic Republic of the Congo
Fish of the Republic of the Congo
Fish described in 1969
Strongly electric fish